João Rodrigues may refer to:

João Rodrigues Tçuzu (1561–1633), Portuguese Jesuit missionary in Japan and China
João Rodrigues (1500s-1600s), also known as Juan Rodriguez or Jan Rodrigues, first known non-indigenous resident of Manhattan
João Barbosa Rodrigues (1842–1909), Brazilian botanist
João Pedro Rodrigues (born 1966), Portuguese film director
João Rodrigues (sailor) (born 1971), Portuguese Olympic sailor
João Rodrigues (cyclist) (born 1994), Portuguese road racing cyclist
Joao Rodríguez (footballer) (born 1996), Colombian footballer who plays for Central Córdoba